Chitragupt Shrivastava (16 November 1917 – 14 January 1991), better known as Chitragupt, was an Indian film music director in Hindi cinema and Bhojpuri cinema.

Personal life
He was born in Sawreji, a village located in Saran district in the Indian state of Bihar (now in Gopalganj district). His sons, Anand and Milind Shrivastava, are also Bollywood music directors.

Career
He mostly worked with lyricist Majrooh Sultanpuri.

Also the song "Machalti Hui Hawa Mein Chham Chham" sung by Kishore Kumar and Lata Mangeshkar from "Ganga Ki Lahrein" was a hit. He made Kishore Kumar sing the semi classical song "Payalwaali Dekh Na"  and the popular song "Agar Sun Le Koi Nagma".

Filmography

 Fighting Hero (1946)
 Toofan Queen (1946)
 Lady Robinhood (1946)
 Jadui Ratan (1947)
 Shake Hand (1947)
 Stunt Queen (1947)
 Mala The Mighty (1948)
 Jai Hind (1948)
 11 O'Clock (1948)
 Tigress (1948)
 Joker (1949)
 Bhakt Pundalik (1949)
 Shaukeen (1949)
 Delhi Express (1949)
 Jodidaar (1950)
 Circuswaale (1950)
 Veer Babruvahan (1950)
 Hamara Ghar (1950)
 Hamaari Shaan (1951)
 Jeevan Taara (1951)
 Sindbad The Sailor (1952) 
 Bhakt Puraan (1952)
 Tarang (1952)
 Naag Panchami (1953)
 Naya Raasta (1953)
 Manchala (1953)
 Miss Mala (1954)
 Sultanat (1954)
 Tulsidas (1954)
 Alibaba Aur Chaalis Chor  (1954)
 Toote Khilone(1954)
 Navratri (1955)
 Shiv Bhakt (1955)
 Sati Madalasa (1955)
 Raj Kanya (1955)
 Raj Darbaar (1955)
 Shree Ganesh Vivaah (1955)
 Shrikrishna Bhakti (1955)
 Mahasati Savitri (1955)
 Kismat (1956)
 Basre Ki Hoor (1956)
 Basant Panchami (1956)
 Zindagi Ke Mele (1956)
 Jai Shree (1956)
 Insaaf (1956)
 Captain Kishore (1957)
 Talwar Ki Dhani (1957)
 Neel Mani (1957)
 Bhabhi (1957)
 Laxmi Pooja (1957)
 Pawanputra Hanuman (1957)
 Sakshi Gopal (1957)
 Taxi Stand (1958)
 Daughter Of Sindbad (1958)
 Chaalbaaz (1958)
 Balyogi Upamanyu (1958)
 Maya Bazaar (1958)
 Teesri Gali (1958)
 Raj Singhasan (1958)
 Zimbo (1958)
 Kangan (1959)
 Madam X Y Z (1959)
 Daaka (1959)
 Commander (1959)
 Naya Sansaar (1959)
 Kaali Topi Laal Rumaal (1959)
 Kal Hamaara Hain (1959)
 Guest House (1959)
 Baazigar (1961)
 Barkha (1959)
 Chand Mere Aaja (1960)
 Maa Baap (1960)
 Baraat (1960)
 Gambler (1960)
 Patang (1960)
 Naache Naagin Baaje Been (1960) 
 Police Detective (1960)
 Zimbo Comes To Town (1960)
 Tel Maalish Boot Polish (1961) 
 Bade Ghar Ki Bahu (1961) 
 Bada Aadmi (1961)
 Opera House (1961)
 Zabak (1961)
 Ramu Dada (1961)
 Suhaag Sindoor (1961)
 Aplam Chaplam (1962)
 Rocket Girl (1962)
 King Kong (1962)
 Main Chup Rahungi (1962)
 Shaadi (1962)
 Bezubaan (1962)
 Band Master (1963)
 Ganga Maiyya Tohe Piyari Chadhaibo (1962) (Bhojpuri Film)
 Main Shaadi Karne Chala (1963)
 Hum Matwaale Naujawan (1962) 
 Burma Road (1962)
 Ghar Basaake Dekho (1963) 
 Laagi Naahi Chhute Ram (1963)
 Mummy Daddy (1963)
 Kabuli Khan (1963)
 Aankh Michouli (1963)
 Ek Raaz (1963)
 Baaghi (1964) 
 Ganga Ki Lahren (1964) 
 Samson (1964)
 Mera Qasoor Kya Hain? (1964)
 Main Bhi Ladki Hoon (1964)
 Akashdeep (1965)
 Saat Samundar Paar (1965)
 Oonche Log (1965)
 Mahabharat (1965)
 Aadhi Raat Ke Baad (1965)
 Afsaana (1966)
 Biradari (1966)
 Toofan Mein Pyaar Kahan (1966)
 Vaasna (1967)
 Aulaad (1968) 
 Maa (1968)
 Pyar Ka Sapna (1969)
 Nai Zindagi (1969)
 Bank Robbery (1969)
 Pardesi (1970)
 Sansaar (1971)
 Kabhi Dhoop Kabhi Chhaon (1971)
 Hamaara Adhikaar (1971)
 Prem Ki Ganga (1971)
 Saaz Aur Sanam (1972) 
 Dost (1974) (Background Music)
 Intezaar (1973)
 Shikwa (1974)
 Balak Aur Janwar (1975) 
 Rangeen Duniya (1975)
 Angaarey  (1976)
 Sikka (1976)
 Jai Mahalaxmi Maa (1976)
 Toofan Aur Bijlee (1976)
 Gayatri Mahima (1977) 
 Aladdin And The Wonderful Lamp (1978)
 The Adventures of Aladdin (1979) 
 Do Shikaari (1978) 
   Mahi Munda [Punjabi movie] (1979)
 Shiv Shakti (1980)
 Jwala Dahej Ki (1982) 
 Film Hi Film (1983)
 Ganga Kinare Mora Gaon (1984)
 Sant Ravidas Ki Amar Kahani (1984)
 Bhaiya Dooj 1984
 Ghar Dwaar (1985)
 Piya Ke Gaon (1985)
 Insaaf Ki Manzil (1988)
 Chandaal (1998)

Songs
Songs composed by Chitragupt:

References

External links
 

1917 births
1991 deaths
Musicians from Bihar
Hindi film score composers
20th-century Indian composers
People from Saran district
Indian male film score composers
20th-century male musicians